Who Would You Take to a Deserted Island? is a 2019 Spanish drama film directed by Jota Linares.

Cast 
 Pol Monen as Eze
 Jaime Lorente as Marcos
 Andrea Ros as Celeste
 María Pedraza as Marta
 Beatriz Arjona as Maggie

References

External links 

2019 drama films
2019 films
Spanish-language Netflix original films
Spanish drama films